Stolen Goods is a lost 1915 American drama silent film directed by George Melford and written by Margaret Turnbull. The film stars Blanche Sweet, Cleo Ridgely, House Peters, Sr., Horace B. Carpenter, Sydney Deane and Theodore Roberts. The film was released on May 24, 1915, by Paramount Pictures.

Plot
An orphan named Margery (Blanche Sweet) is working a dressmaking company in New York. She is sent to prison when a rich kleptomaniac named Helen North (Cleo Ridgely) puts some stolen lace in Margery's handbag. After leaving the prison she becomes a nurse for some time until the hospital she works at finds out she has a record. She leaves and becomes a nurse at a Red Cross emergency hospital in Belgium. At the same time, Helen has come to Belgium to take care of her sick father. After he dies, she is left without any money. She is planning to leave for California to live with her father's wealthy friend when an airship bomb sends Helen to the hospital Margery is working at. Another shell explodes and makes Margery think Helen is dead. Margery takes Helen's identity to go to California. She falls in love with a doctor named Richard Carlton (House Peters, Sr.) and right before they are supposed to get married Helen shows up. In order to stop people from taking Helen to the insane asylum, Margery confesses the truth. Carlton still wants to marry her anyway.

Cast 
Blanche Sweet as Margery Huntley
Cleo Ridgely as Helen North
House Peters, Sr. as Richard Carlton
Horace B. Carpenter as French surgeon 
Sydney Deane as Mr. North
Theodore Roberts as German surgeon major

References

External links 
 

1915 films
1910s English-language films
American adventure films
1915 adventure films
Paramount Pictures films
Films directed by George Melford
American black-and-white films
American silent feature films
Lost American films
1915 lost films
Lost adventure films
1910s American films
Silent adventure films